Gurjinder Singh (born 14 September 1997) is a Greek-Indian professional footballer who plays as a forward for Super League 2 club Proodeftiki.

Personal life
Born in Greece, Singh is of Indian descent.

Career statistics

Club

Notes

Honours
Ionikos
Super League Greece 2: 2020–21

References

1997 births
Living people
Greek footballers
Greek people of Indian descent
Association football forwards
Platanias F.C. players
Footballers from Piraeus